WZLO (103.1 MHz) is a commercial FM radio station broadcasting an adult album alternative format. Licensed to Dover-Foxcroft, Maine, the station serves the Bangor area.  It is also broadcast on 98.3 in Bangor using an FM translator.  The studios and offices are in Bangor, while the transmitter is off Route 15 in Charleston, Maine.

The station is owned by The Zone Corporation, the broadcast company owned by authors Tabitha and Stephen King.

History
The station signed on in November 1980 as WDME-FM, simulcasting the middle-of-the-road format of its sister station WDME (1340 AM), which had begun on August 13, 1967.  The call sign stood for the home city of Dover, Maine.

The AM station was closed down, and its license allowed to expire in 1991, for economic reasons.  WDME-FM continued as a stand-alone FM station, airing an eclectic adult contemporary format.

Under its previous ownership, WDME-FM referred to itself on-air as, "The only radio station in the world broadcasting from a railroad passenger car."  WDME's studios were located in a converted Amtrak coach formerly situated beside Routes 6 and 15 to the north and west of Dover-Foxcroft.  The station was known for its folksy portrayal of rural culture in the north woods of Maine.  It featured locally-known personalities such as John Simcoe and Paul Knaut.

WDME was purchased by The Zone Corporation in 2001.  Gradually, the station changed to an adult album alternative format.  It later switched to a simulcast of WZON (620 AM), a sports radio station, in 2009.  The WZON-FM call letters was adopted on August 27.

WZON-FM switched to a progressive talk format on January 4, 2010.  The station also carried Boston Red Sox baseball, along with WZON.  Shortly after WZON (AM) began simulcasting WZON-FM on November 1, 2010, Red Sox games were moved exclusively to the AM station (which previously shared the broadcasts with WDME/WZON-FM). WZON-FM began stunting with Christmas music in November 2012, with the previous format moving exclusively to WZON (AM). The call letters were changed to WZLO on November 23, and the station returned to an adult album alternative format, initially branded as "103.1 The Loft", on December 26, 2012.

References

External links

ZLO
Piscataquis County, Maine
Radio stations established in 1980
1980 establishments in Maine
Dover-Foxcroft, Maine
Adult album alternative radio stations in the United States
Stephen King